FHPP may refer to:

 Familial hypokalemic periodic paralysis, a rare, autosomal dominant channelopathy characterized by periodic muscle weakness or paralysis
 Friction hydro pillar processing, a solid-state joining technology